Presenting the Fabulous Ronettes is the only album by American girl group the Ronettes (credited to "the Ronettes featuring Veronica"). Produced by Phil Spector and released in November 1964 through his label, Philles Records, the album collects the group's singles from 1963–1964. In 2004, it was ranked number 422 on Rolling Stone's list of "The 500 Greatest Albums of All Time".

Track listing

Personnel 

The Ronettes
Estelle Bennettvocals
Veronica Bennettvocals
Nedra Talleyvocals

Production
Phil Spectorproducer
Jack Nitzschearranger
Larry Levineengineer

Additional musicians
Don Randipiano
Al De Lorypiano
Larry Knechtelpiano, bass guitar
Leon Russellpiano
Harold Battistepiano
Steve Douglas, Jay Migliori, Lou Blackburn, Roy Catonhorns
Ray Pohlmanbass guitar
Jimmy Bondbass guitar
Hal Blainedrums
Barney Kesselguitars
Tom Tedescoguitars
Carol Kayeguitars
Bill Pitmanguitars
Vincent Poncia Jr.guitars
Frank Capppercussion
Julius Wechterpercussion
Sonny Bonopercussion

References

Albums produced by Phil Spector
Presenting the Fabulous Ronettes featuring Veronica
1964 debut albums
Philles Records albums
Albums recorded at Gold Star Studios
Orchestral pop albums